Orthogonius termiticola is a species of ground beetle in the subfamily Orthogoniinae. It was described by Wasmann in 1902.

References

termiticola
Beetles described in 1902